The 2019 America East Conference baseball tournament was held from May 22 to 25, 2019. The top six teams out of the league's seven members met in the double-elimination tournament held at Varsity Field in Vestal, New York, the home park of Binghamton. The tournament champion, Stony Brook, received the conference's automatic bid into the 2019 NCAA Division I baseball tournament.

Seeding and format
The top six teams from the regular season were seeded one through six based on conference winning percentage only. The No. 1 and No. 2 seeds received a first-round bye. The teams then played a double-elimination tournament.

Bracket

Conference championship

References

Tournament
America East Conference Baseball Tournament
America East Conference Baseball
America East Conference baseball tournament
College baseball tournaments in New York (state)